Anomis noctivolans is a moth of the family Erebidae. It was first described by Arthur Gardiner Butler in 1880. It is endemic to the Hawaiian islands of Kauai, Oahu, Molokai and Maui.

The larvae feed on Hibiscus and Sida species.

External links

Catocalinae
Endemic moths of Hawaii
Moths described in 1880